Theaflavin digallate (TFDG) is an antioxidant natural phenol found in black tea, and a theaflavin derivative.

Health 
 TFDG is a scavenger of superoxide in vitro, even more so than EGCG.
 Tea polyphenols including TFDG reduce angiogenesis, which is implicated in non-liquid cancers, an area of intense current research, by decreasing vascular endothelial growth factor production and receptor phosphorylation.
 TFDG inhibits activity of the enzyme 3CLpro in vitro.

References 

Thearubigins
Phenol antioxidants
SARS-CoV-2 main protease inhibitors